The 2015 Campeonato Amazonense de Futebol was the 99th edition of Amazonas's top professional football league. The competition began on 21 February and ended on 20 June. Nacional won the championship by the 43rd time.

Format
In the first stage all participating teams play each other. The first four teams placed at the end of this first stage will be classified for the semifinals.

In the semifinals, the first place will face the fourth while the second place will face the third. They will be played two games, and both the first and second place will have the advantage of getting two results equal to advance to the final.

In the final two games will be played, and the team from the two involved in the dispute, with the best record in the first stage, will have the advantage of getting two results equal to be the champion.

First stage

Semi-finals

First leg

Second leg

Finals

First leg

Second leg

References

Campeonato Amazonense
Amazonense